Tras Honan (born 4 January 1930) is a former Irish Fianna Fáil politician from Ennis in County Clare who served as a senator for 15 years. She was elected to the position of Cathaoirleach (Chair of Seanad Éireann) on two occasions, becoming the first and only woman elected to the position.

She was born in Dublin and educated at St. Leo's Convent, Carlow and at the Mercy Convent, Clonmel. She worked as a housewife and businesswoman before becoming active in politics.

In 1977, she was elected to the 14th Seanad as a Fianna Fáil candidate on the Administrative Panel and served for 15 years until her defeat at the 1993 elections to the 20th Seanad.  In 1982, in the short-lived 16th Seanad, she was elected to the position of Cathaoirleach, the first woman to hold the post. In 1983, in the 17th Seanad, she was elected as Leas-Chathaoirleach (Deputy Chair), and in 1987, in the 18th Seanad, she was re-elected as Cathaoirleach.

Family
Honan is the widow of Dermot Honan, a senator from 1965 to 1975; his father T. V. Honan was also a senator from 1934 to 1954. She was also a sister of Carrie Acheson, a TD.

See also
Families in the Oireachtas

References

1930 births
Living people
Cathaoirligh of Seanad Éireann
Fianna Fáil senators
Members of the 14th Seanad
Members of the 15th Seanad
Members of the 16th Seanad
Members of the 17th Seanad
Members of the 18th Seanad
Members of the 19th Seanad
20th-century women members of Seanad Éireann
People from Ennis
Politicians from County Clare
Politicians from County Dublin
Spouses of Irish politicians